Giacomo Albertolli (1761 – 6 June 1805) was a Swiss-born architect who was active in Italy during the Neoclassical period.

He was born in Bedano in the province of Ticino. He was the nephew of Giocondo Albertolli, a professor of architecture at the Brera Academy. In 1797, Giacomo became professor of civil architecture in the Seminary of Padua. With the Austrian occupation, he moved to Milan, where he replaced his teacher, Giuseppe Piermarini. He died of apoplexy (stroke).

References 

1761 births
1805 deaths
People from Bedano
Architects from Ticino
18th-century Swiss painters
18th-century Swiss male artists
Swiss male painters
19th-century Swiss painters
19th-century Italian architects
Academic staff of Brera Academy
19th-century Swiss male artists